Becoming a Jackal is the debut album by the Irish rock group Villagers. In 2010 it was nominated for the Mercury Prize. Vinyl editions of the album contain 2 discs, with tracks on the first three sides and an etching on the fourth.

Critical reception

The album received positive reviews, and holds a Metacritic score of 78 out of 100, based on 16 reviews.

Track listing

Chart positions

References

Villagers (band) albums
2010 debut albums
Domino Recording Company albums